Sir Murrough O'Brien, 10th Baron of Inchiquin, 5th Baron O'Brien of Burren, 1st Baron Thomond of Taplow, 5th Earl of Inchiquin, 1st Marquess of Thomond KP, PC (Ire) (1726 – 10 February 1808), known from 1777 to 1800 as the 5th Earl of Inchiquin, was an Irish peer, soldier and politician.

Life
Murrough O'Brien was born in 1726 to the Hon. James O' Brien and Mary Jephson in Drogheda. James' brother (and Murrough's uncle) was Henry O'Brien, 8th Earl of Thomond, whose heir was Percy Wyndham O'Brien, 1st Earl of Thomond (c. 1713 – 1774), brother of Charles Wyndham, 2nd Earl of Egremont (1710–1763) of Petworth House.

He joined the Grenadier Guards and was an officer in Germany, where he carried colours at the Battle of Lauffeld in 1747. He retired in 1756 and entered the Irish House of Commons for Clare in the following year. He represented the constituency until 1761 and sat then as Member of Parliament (MP) for Harristown until 1768.

Because of his support for the Act of Union of Great Britain and Ireland, on 29 December 1800 he was created Marquess of Thomond in the Peerage of Ireland, with a special remainder to his younger brother, and Baron Thomond, of Taplow Court in the County of Buckingham in the Peerage of the United Kingdom on 2 October 1801 (which title allowed him to sit in the United Kingdom House of Lords), but this time with no special remainder. He had a close relationship with King George III. In 1783 he was one of the Founding Knights of the Order of St Patrick. His Irish seat was at Rostellan, near Cork city.

He was a drinker, called a "'six bottle man", and a gambler. He was a keen farmer and oversaw the enclosure of lands around Taplow and mechanisation.

Marriages and children

He married twice:
 Firstly in 1753 to Mary O'Brien, 3rd Countess of Orkney (died 1790), by whom he had a daughter, Mary O'Brien, 4th Countess of Orkney (1755–1831).  
 Secondly on 25 July 1792, to Mary Palmer (1750-1820), heiress of Sir Joshua Reynolds. They initially lived in Reynolds' former home in Leicester Square.

He also is reputed to have had an illegitimate son, Thomas Carter (1769–1800), who was a composer in London during the 1790s. Thomas lived with Inchiquin at Taplow Court after his return from India in July 1789, and lent the earl all the money he earned in a benefit concert in Calcutta. In return, Inchiquin recommended Thomas to all his friends as a coal merchant; he had gone into that field after his marriage to Mary Wells in 1793 in order to support his growing family.

Death and succession
He died after a fall from his horse in Grosvenor Square, London on 10 February 1808. The title of Marquess of Thomond passed to his nephew William O'Brien, 2nd Marquess of Thomond. The barony of Thomond became extinct.

References

 

1726 births
1808 deaths
Politicians from County Clare
19th-century Irish people
British Army personnel of the War of the Austrian Succession
Inchiquin, Murrough Obrien, 5th Earl of
Inchiquin, Murrough Obrien, 5th Earl of
Deaths by horse-riding accident in England
Grenadier Guards officers
Obrien, Murrough
Obrien, Murrough
Knights of St Patrick
Inchiquin, Murrough Obrien, 5th Earl of
Inchiquin, Murrough Obrien, 5th Earl of
Members of the Privy Council of Ireland
Murrough
Members of the Parliament of Ireland (pre-1801) for County Clare constituencies
Members of the Parliament of Ireland (pre-1801) for County Kildare constituencies
Marquesses of Thomond
Irish chiefs of the name